Appiani is an Italian surname. Among people with this name are:
Members of the noble Appiani family, which flourished from the 13th to the 17th centuries, and were lords or princes of Piombino. Their biographies are summarized in the family article.
Andrea Appiani "the elder" (1754–1817), neoclassical painter.
Andrea Appiani "the younger" (1817–1865), historical painter, great-nephew of the above.
Francesco Appiani (1704–1792), Italian painter.
Galleazzo Appiani, Italian architect who worked in Poland.
Giacomo Vittorio Appiani (died 1482), Italian bishop.
Giuseppe Appiani (1740–1812), Italian painter.
Joseph Ignaz Appiani (1706–1785), German painter of the late Baroque.
Niccolò Appiani Appiano, Milanese painter.
Silvio Appiani (1894–1915), Italian footballer.